Theodore Ayrault Dodge (May 28, 1842 – October 26, 1909) was an American officer, military historian, and businessman. He fought as a Union officer in the American Civil War; as a writer, he was devoted to both the Civil War and the great generals of ancient and European history.

Early life
Born in Pittsfield, Massachusetts, he received a military education in Berlin and attended University College London and the University of Heidelberg. Returning to the United States in 1861, he promptly enlisted as a private in the New York volunteer infantry. Over the course of the Civil War, he rose to the rank of brevet lieutenant-colonel, losing the lower portion of his right leg at the Battle of Gettysburg. He served at the War Department from 1864 and was commissioned in the regular army in 1866. In 1870, he retired with the rank of major, after which he lived in Boston.

Retirement and death 
He invested in various enterprises to manufacture hydraulic hoses, but they failed. Based on a novel tubular loom invented by James E. Gillespie and Robert Cowen, he founded the Boston Woven Hose and Rubber Company in 1884. He later moved to Paris, where he died. He was buried at Arlington National Cemetery, Arlington, Virginia.

Literary career 
His works on the Civil War include The Campaign of Chancellorsville (1881) and Bird's Eye View of the Civil War (1883). From 1890 to 1907, he also published twelve volumes of his History of the Art of War: Alexander, Hannibal, Caesar, Gustavus Adolphus, Frederick the Great, Napoleon, although the volumes on Frederick the Great were not completed before his death. The work has been broken up into individual biographies for modern publication. In addition, his military journal, covering his time with the Army of the Potomac from the Seven Days Battles to Gettysburg, has recently been compiled and published by noted historian Stephen W. Sears under the title On Campaign with the Army of the Potomac: The Civil War Journal of Theodore Ayrault Dodge.

Selected works
 
  Originally published: Boston : Houghton, Mifflin, 1890.
 Originally published: New York : Houghton, Mifflin and company, 1892.
  Originally published: Boston : Houghton, Mifflin, 1895.

References

External links
 
 
 Theodore Ayrault Dodge at ArlingtonCemetery.net, an unofficial website

1842 births
1909 deaths
19th-century American historians
United States Army officers
American military historians
American male non-fiction writers
People of Massachusetts in the American Civil War
Union Army officers
Burials at Arlington National Cemetery
People from Pittsfield, Massachusetts
19th-century American male writers
Historians from Massachusetts
American amputees
Members of the American Academy of Arts and Letters